Operation Golden Flow is an unofficial term that was coined during the Nixon era for the mandatory drug testing of all military service members returning from Vietnam, a program that was headed by Dr. Jerome Jaffe, head of the White House drug office.

In June 1971, the U.S. military announced that they would begin urinalysis of all returning servicemen. The program went into effect in September with favorable results that only 4.5% of the soldiers tested positive for heroin.

American soldiers in Vietnam were not permitted to board a plane home until they passed a urine drug test. If they failed, the soldiers would be forced to stay in Vietnam, undergo detoxification, and try again.

The term had evolved to mean random urinalysis testing and also nicknamed "Lemonade Party".

References

Vietnam War
Drug testing
Nixon administration controversies